Mämmedaly Garadanow (born March 17, 1982) is a Turkmen footballer (striker) playing currently for FC Energetik Mary. Garadanow is also a member of Turkmenistan national football team. He scored two goals in the game versus Cambodia in 2010 FIFA World Cup qualification (AFC). In 2013 with FC Balkan he won the AFC-President's Cup 2013 in Malaysia.

Club career
In 2014, he moved to FC Şagadam, where he became the bronze medalist of Turkmenistan and top scorer of 2014 Ýokary Liga (28 goals).

In 2015, he moved to the FC Ahal.

On 7 April 2021, Garadanow transferred to Turkmen club FC Energetik Mary.

Achievements
 AFC President's Cup: 2013

International career statistics

Goals for Senior National Team

References

External links

Living people
1982 births
Turkmenistan footballers
Turkmenistan international footballers
Sportspeople from Ashgabat
Association football forwards
FC Ahal players